was a district located in Fukuoka Prefecture, Japan.
The district was dissolved on March 1, 1975, when the town of Sawara merged into the expanded city of Fukuoka.

Former districts of Fukuoka Prefecture